New Hanover is a small town in the midlands of KwaZulu-Natal, South Africa,  north-east of Pietermaritzburg and  south of Greytown. It was founded in 1850 and has been administered by a health committee since 1933. It was named after city of Hanover in Germany by the German settlers.

Today this area's principal economy is the sugarcane industry, while the farming of fruits, grains and timber also feature prominently.

References

Populated places in the uMshwathi Local Municipality
Populated places established in 1850
German settlements in South Africa